BGN/PCGN romanization system for Russian is a method for romanization of Cyrillic Russian texts, that is, their transliteration into the Latin alphabet as used in the English language.

There are a number of systems for romanization of Russian, but the BGN/PCGN system is relatively intuitive for anglophones to pronounce. It is part of the larger set of BGN/PCGN romanizations, which includes methods for 29 different languages. It was developed by the United States Board on Geographic Names (BGN) and by the Permanent Committee on Geographical Names for British Official Use (PCGN). The portion of the system pertaining to the Russian language was adopted by BGN in 1944, and by PCGN in 1947.

This romanization of Russian can be rendered by using only the basic letters and punctuation found on English-language keyboards. No diacritics or unusual letters are required, but the interpunct character (·) is optionally used to avoid some ambiguity.

In many publications, a simplified form of the system is used to render English versions of Russian names, which typically converts ë to yo, simplifies -iy and -yy endings to -y and omits apostrophes for ъ and ь.

The following table describes the system and provides examples.

See also
ISO 9
GOST 16876-71
Wikipedia:Romanization of Russian

Notes

References

External links 
  GEOnet Names Server
 BGN/PCGN transliteration online, also supports the ISO 9, ALA-LC, GOST / UN, and Scholarly systems

Russian
Russian
Russian language